Cerite is a complex silicate mineral group containing cerium, formula . The cerium and lanthanum content varies with the Ce rich species (cerite-(Ce)) and the La rich species (cerite-(La)). Analysis of a sample from the Mountain Pass carbonatite gave 35.05%  and 30.04% .

Cerite was first described in 1803 for an occurrence in Bastnäs in Västmanland, Sweden. The lanthanum rich species, cerite-(La) was first described for an occurrence in the Khibina massif, Kola Peninsula, Russia in 2002.

See also

 Classification of minerals
 List of minerals

References

External links

Lanthanide minerals
Iron minerals
Cerium minerals
Nesosilicates
Trigonal minerals
Minerals in space group 161